The Municipal Library Consortium of St. Louis County (MLC) is a partnership of nine independent public libraries in St. Louis County, Missouri. It was formed in 1997 as a way for the libraries to share a patron and bibliographic database as well as other resources. A valid library card from any of the member libraries can be used in any other MLC library.

History
On May 31, 1996, eight independent public libraries in St. Louis County formed the MLC, including Brentwood Public Library, Ferguson Municipal Public Library, Kirkwood Public Library, Maplewood Public Library, Richmond Heights Memorial Library, Rock Hill Public Library, University City Public Library and Valley Park Community Library. Webster Groves Public Library later joined increasing the number of member libraries to nine.

Facilities
MLC consists of nine independent public libraries including:

 Brentwood Public Library
 Ferguson Municipal Public Library
 Kirkwood Public Library
 Maplewood Public Library
 Richmond Heights Memorial Library
 Rock Hill Public Library
 University City Public Library
 Valley Park Community Library
 Webster Groves Public Library

See also
 Education in Greater St. Louis

References

External links
 
 Municipal Library Consortium of St. Louis County (Libraries.org)

 
1996 establishments in Missouri